Renaissance Apartments is a historic apartment building located at Hancock Street and Nostrand Avenue in Bedford-Stuyvesant, Brooklyn, New York City. It was built in 1892 and is a five-story masonry building in the French Renaissance style.  It features elaborately decorated principal facades and prominent circular corner towers with slate covered conical roofs.  It has steeply sloped slate mansard roofs with terra cotta ridge caps and gabled roof dormers.

It was listed on the National Register of Historic Places in 1995.

See also 
List of New York City Landmarks
National Register of Historic Places listings in Kings County, New York

References

Bedford–Stuyvesant, Brooklyn
National Register of Historic Places in Brooklyn
New York City Designated Landmarks in Brooklyn
Residential buildings completed in 1892
Residential buildings in Brooklyn
Residential buildings on the National Register of Historic Places in New York City